Usquert is a village in the Dutch province of Groningen. It is located in the municipality of Het Hogeland. It had a population of around 1,415 in January 2017.

History
Usquert was a separate municipality until 1990, when it became part of Hefshuizen. After that, the name of the municipality was changed to Eemsmond in 1992.

References

External links

Het Hogeland
Populated places in Groningen (province)
Former municipalities of Groningen (province)